Alexander Nikolaevich Uvarov (March 7, 1922 – December 24, 1994) was a Russian ice hockey player, who played in the Soviet Hockey League.

He was born in Odoyev, Tula region, Soviet Union.

Uvarov played 1948–1960 for HC Dynamo Moscow (259 matches, 203 goals, 21 hat-tricks) and 1954–1957 for Soviet national team.

Olympic champion 1956. World champion 1954, 1956. European champion 1954–1956. USSR champion 1954.

He was inducted into the Russian and Soviet Hockey Hall of Fame in 1954.

External links
 Russian and Soviet Hockey Hall of Fame bio
 Short biography 
 HC Dynamo Moscow Statistics 

1922 births
1994 deaths
HC Dynamo Moscow players
Ice hockey players at the 1956 Winter Olympics
Medalists at the 1956 Winter Olympics
Olympic gold medalists for the Soviet Union
Olympic ice hockey players of the Soviet Union
Olympic medalists in ice hockey
People from Odoyevsky District
Sportspeople from Tula Oblast